Gilberto Alves, nicknamed Gil (born December 24, 1950 in Nova Lima), is a former footballer from Brazil. He played as a forward, in particular with Fluminense Football Club and the Brazil national team.

Playing career
Gil played for several clubs, starting his career with Villa Nova in 1970, playing for Comercial from 1974 to 1977. He played for Fluminense during the time where the club was nicknamed Máquina Tricolor (Three Color Machine). He then moved to its former club's rivals, Botafogo, where he stayed until 1980, when he joined Corinthians, moving in the subsequent years to Real Murcia of Spain, Coritiba, and Farense of Portugal, respectively.

National team
He received 41 caps, scoring 13 goals from April 1976 to June 1978, and played seven games during the World Cup 1978.

Managerial career
On September 2, 2008, Gilberto Alves was hired as Marília's manager.

Honours
Campeonato Brasileiro Série B in 1971 with Villa Nova
Campeonato Carioca (Rio de Janeiro State championship) in 1975 and 1976 with Fluminense
Taça Guanabara in 1975 and 1976 with Fluminense
Coupe Rio Branco in 1976 with Fluminense
Roca Cup in 1976 with Fluminense

References

External links
 

1950 births
Living people
Brazilian footballers
1978 FIFA World Cup players
Brazil international footballers
Brazilian expatriate footballers
Expatriate footballers in Spain
Expatriate footballers in Portugal
Brazilian football managers
Villa Nova Atlético Clube players
Fluminense FC players
Botafogo de Futebol e Regatas players
Sport Club Corinthians Paulista players
Real Murcia players
Coritiba Foot Ball Club players
S.C. Farense players
Avaí FC managers
Fortaleza Esporte Clube managers
Botafogo de Futebol e Regatas managers
Club Alianza Lima managers
Marília Atlético Clube managers
Associação Atlética Portuguesa (Santos) managers
Association football forwards